The 1979 Avon Championships of California, also known as the Avon Championships of Oakland, was a women's tennis tournament played on indoor carpet courts at the Oakland Coliseum  in Oakland, California in the United States that was part of the 1979 Avon Championships Circuit. It was the eighth edition of the tournament and was held from January 8 through January 14, 1979. First-seeded Martina Navratilova won the singles title and earned $24,000 first-prize money.

Finals

Singles
 Martina Navratilova defeated  Chris Evert 7–5, 7–5
 It was Navratilova's 1st singles title of the year and the 25th of her career.

Doubles
 Chris Evert /  Rosie Casals defeated  Tracy Austin /  Betty Stöve 3–6, 6–4, 6–3

Prize money

See also
 Evert–Navratilova rivalry

References

External links
 Women's Tennis Association (WTA) tournament edition details
 International Tennis Federation (ITF) tournament edition details

Avon Championships of California
Silicon Valley Classic
Avon Championships of California
Avon Championships of California
Avon Championships of California